Francisco Javier Barrio Terrazas (born November 25, 1950) is a Mexican politician affiliated with the National Action Party (PAN). He is a former governor of Chihuahua and former secretary in the cabinet of President Vicente Fox.

Barrio was born in Satevo, Chihuahua, and received a bachelor's degree in accounting and an MBA from the Autonomous University of Chihuahua. He did some consulting and worked in the private sector before joining the local chapter of the National Action Party in 1983 and becoming its first member to ever win the mayorship of Juárez, Chihuahua.

He ran for governor in 1986 and lost against the PRI candidate, Fernando Baeza Meléndez, in one of the most controversial elections in the state's recent history. Six years later he made another attempt and won, ending more than 60 years of uninterrupted control of Chihuahua's  governorship by members of the Institutional Revolutionary Party. As a governor, he delivered mixed results and consequently the PRI regained control of the state at the end of his term.  While governor of Chihuahua, hundreds of women were raped and murdered in Juarez. Barrio refused for years to mount an inquiry, and suggested the attacks were not surprising because the victims walked in dark places at night and wore provocative clothing.

In the course of his political career, Barrio-Terrazas has served as Mayor of Ciudad Juárez and Governor of the State of Chihuahua, a post he held from 1992 to 1998. In the 80’s, he held leadership roles in his native state during the political-democratic transition process, and later served as one of the first governors to rise from the ranks of the opposition party.

During his tenure as governor, the State of Chihuahua placed first in the country in anti-corruption and good governance, according to the annual review conducted by the prestigious Monterrey Technological Institute of Higher Studies (ITESM).
Barrio headed the Federal Comptroller's Secretariat (2000–2003) and, in 2003, was elected to the Chamber of Deputies, where he became the leader of the National Action Party's parliamentary group.

On February 24, 2005, he expressed interest in becoming the PAN presidential candidate and campaigned for a few months before quitting on July 7, arguing partisan favoritism towards the former minister of the interior, Santiago Creel.

In January 2009 he was named as the Mexican ambassador to Canada.  This was met with controversy and protests from rights organizations in Canada and Mexico, due to his actions during the Juarez murders.

See also 
Creel-Terrazas Family

External links

  Francisco Barrio's Presidential Campaign.
  Can Francisco Barrio Break the Culture of Corruption? article on Business Week.

References

1950 births
Governors of Chihuahua (state)
Ambassadors of Mexico to Canada
Living people
Municipal presidents of Juárez
National Action Party (Mexico) politicians
Autonomous University of Chihuahua alumni
Members of the Chamber of Deputies (Mexico)
20th-century Mexican politicians
Deputies of the LIX Legislature of Mexico